Shanhui Fan (born 1972) is a Chinese-born American electrical engineer and physicist, with a focus on theoretical, computational and numerical aspects of photonics and electromagnetism. He is a professor of electrical engineering, and a professor of applied physics (by courtesy) at Stanford University. He is the director of the Edward L. Ginzton Lab and Senior Fellow at the Precourt Institute for Energy.

Education
Fan did his undergraduate study in physics from the University of Science and Technology of China from 1988 to 1992. He completed his PhD in Electrical Engineering from Massachusetts Institute of Technology (MIT) in 1997, after which he continued as a postdoctoral researcher in the same group at MIT. His advisor was John D. Joannopoulos.

Career
Fan joined Stanford's faculty of electrical engineering in April, 2001.

In 2012, he was a Visiting professor of physics at University of Sydney.

Since 2014, Fan has been the Director of the Edward L. Ginzton Lab. He was appointed Senior Fellow at the Precourt Institute for Energy and courtesy professor of Applied Physics through January 31, 2021.

Fan's research areas include nanophotonics, photonic crystals, metamaterials, topological photonics, plasmonics, solar cells.

, Fan has been granted approximately 57 patents.

Selected works
Coupled Mode Theory For Optical Resonances:

Modulation Induced Non-Reciprocity:

Daytime Radiative Cooling:

Awards and honors
 Vannevar Bush Faculty Fellowship (2017)
 Thomson Reuters Highly Cited Researcher in Physics (2015-)
 Fellow, IEEE (2010), for “contributions to nanophotonics”.
 Fellow, SPIE (2010)
 Fellow, the American Physical Society (2008), for “contributions to the theory and applications of nanophotonic structures and devices, including photonic crystals, plasmonics and meta-materials.
 Fellow, the Optical Society of America (2008), “For many deep and creative contributions to physics, analysis, and novel devices in semiconductor, dielectric and metallic optical nanostructures”.
 The Adolph Lomb Medal from the Optical Society of America (2007), “For fundamental work in nano-photonic structures”.
 The William O. Baker Award for Initiatives in Research (previously the NAS Award for Initiatives in Research) (2007), “For innovative research on the theory and applications of photonic crystal devices”.
 David and Lucile Packard Foundation Fellowship for Science and Engineering (2003)
 National Science Foundation Faculty Early Career Development Award (2002)

References

External links 
 Google Scholar, Shanhui Fan
 Shanhui Fan Profile at Stanford University

1972 births
Living people
American electrical engineers
Chinese electrical engineers
Chinese emigrants to the United States
Educators from Henan
Engineers from Henan
Fellow Members of the IEEE
Fellows of SPIE
Fellows of Optica (society)
Fellows of the American Physical Society
MIT School of Engineering alumni
Metamaterials scientists
Optical engineers
People from Zhengzhou
Stanford University Department of Electrical Engineering faculty
University of Science and Technology of China alumni